Shakar Ab (also Romanized as Shakar Āb) is a village in Ojarud-e Shomali Rural District of the Central District of Germi County, Ardabil province, Iran. At the 2006 census, its population was 394 in 74 households. The following census in 2011 counted 350 people in 84 households. The latest census in 2016 showed a population of 311 people in 85 households; it was the largest village in its rural district.

References 

Germi County

Towns and villages in Germi County

Populated places in Ardabil Province

Populated places in Germi County